The 3rd Ukrainian Soviet was a field army of the Red Army during the Russian Civil War, which existed between April 15, 1919 and June 13, 1919 as part of the Ukrainian Front. Then the troops became part of the newly formed 12th Army of the Western Front.

History

The 3rd Ukrainian Soviet Army fought against the UNR Army in the Odessa - Kherson -Mykolaiv area, and by the end of April had cleared the entire Left Bank from the enemy from Transnistria to Tiraspol. 
On May 11, 1919, the Army forces crossed the Dniester river and advanced towards Chisinau, but the offensive was halted after the beginning of the anti-Soviet Grigoriev Uprising. Parts of the Army participated in the suppression of this uprising. 

On May 28, the Army transferred part of the troops to the Southern Front and went on the defensive against the advancing White troops of Anton Denikin.

Commanders  
 Nikolai Khudyakov (April 15 - June 13, 1919).

Sources 
 Civil war and military intervention in the USSR. Encyclopedia. Moscow: Soviet Encyclopedia, 1983.
 Central State Archive of the Soviet Army. In two volumes. Volume 1. Guide. TsGASA, 1991, pp. 292-293
 Savchenko VA A. Twelve Wars for Ukraine. - Kharkov: Folio, 2006.

Armies of Ukraine
Soviet field armies in the Russian Civil War
Military units and formations established in 1919
Military units and formations disestablished in 1919